Barbro Larsdotter Flodquist (19 April 1919 – 29 January 1971) was a Swedish film actress. She appeared in 17 films between 1940 and 1955.

Selected filmography

 Hanna in Society (1940)
 Blossom Time (1940)
 Sun Over Klara (1942)
 Little Napoleon (1943)
 Kungsgatan (1943)
 Kvarterets olycksfågel (1947)
 Neglected by His Wife (1947)
 The Night Watchman's Wife (1947)
 Music in Darkness (1948)
 The Street (1949)
 Restaurant Intim (1950)
 Darling of Mine (1955)

References

External links

1919 births
1971 deaths
Swedish film actresses
Actresses from Stockholm
20th-century Swedish actresses